The ruble (alternatively rouble;) is the currency unit of Belarus and Russia. Historically, it was the currency of the Russian Empire and of the Soviet Union.

, currencies named ruble in circulation include the Belarusian ruble (BYN, Rbl) in Belarus and the Russian ruble (RUB, ₽) in Russia. Additionally, the Transnistrian ruble is used in Transnistria, an unrecognized breakaway province of Moldova. These currencies are subdivided into one hundred kopeks. No kopek is currently formally subdivided, although denga (½ kopek) and polushka (½ denga, thus ¼ kopek) were minted until the 19th century.

Historically, the grivna, ruble and denga were used in Russia as measurements of weight. In 1704, as a result of monetary reforms by Peter the Great, the ruble became the first decimal currency. The silver ruble was used until 1897 and the gold ruble was used until 1917. The Soviet ruble officially replaced the imperial ruble in 1922 and continued to be used until 1993, when it was formally replaced with the Russian ruble in the Russian Federation and by other currencies in other post-Soviet states.

In the past, several other countries influenced by Russia and the Soviet Union had currency units that were also named ruble, including the Armenian ruble, Latvian ruble and Tajikistani ruble.

Etymology

Origins
According to one version, the word "ruble" is derived from the Russian verb рубить (rubit), "to cut, to chop, to hack", as a ruble was considered a cutout piece of a silver grivna.

Others say the ruble was never part of a grivna but a synonym for it. This is attested in a 13th-century birch bark manuscript from Novgorod, where both ruble and grivna referred to ) of silver. The casting of these pieces included some sort of cutting (the exact technology is unknown), hence the name from рубить (rubit).

Another version of the word's origin is that it comes from the Russian noun рубец (rubets), the seam that is left around a silver bullions after casting: silver was added to the cast in two steps. Therefore, the word "ruble" means "a cast with a seam". A popular theory deriving the word ruble from rupee is probably not correct.

The ruble was the Russian equivalent of the mark, a measurement of weight for silver and gold used in medieval Western Europe. The weight of one ruble was equal to the weight of one grivna.

In Russian, a folk name for ruble, tselkovyj (целковый, wholesome), is known, which is a shortening of the целковый рубль ("tselkovyj ruble"), i.e., a wholesome, uncut ruble. This name persists in the Mordvin word for ruble, целковой.

Since the monetary reform of 1534, one Russian accounting ruble became equivalent to 100 silver Novgorod denga coins or smaller 200 Muscovite denga coins or even smaller 400 polushka coins. Exactly the former coin with a rider on it soon became colloquially known as kopek and was the higher coin until the beginning of the 18th century. Ruble coins as such did not exist till Peter the Great, when in 1704 he reformed the old monetary system and ordered mintage of a  silver ruble coin equivalent to 100 new copper kopek coins. Apart from one ruble and one kopek coins other smaller and greater coins existed as well.

English spelling

Both the spellings ruble and rouble are used in English, depending on the author's native dialect. The earliest use recorded in English is the now completely obsolete robble. The form rouble is preferred by the Oxford English Dictionary and probably derives from the transliteration into French used among the Tsarist aristocracy. It may have been retained in English to avoid confusion with "rubble". In general, American, and some Canadian, authors tend to use "ruble" while other English speaking authors use "rouble". In American English there is a tendency for older sources to use rouble and more recent ones to use ruble. However usage is not consistent and major publications are known to use both (though usually preferring one or the other).

The Russian plurals that may be seen on the actual currency are modified according to Russian grammar. Numbers ending in 1 (except for 11) are followed by nominative singular рубль rubl, копейка kopeyka. Numbers ending in 2, 3 or 4 (except for 12–14) are followed by genitive singular рубля rublya, копейки kopeyki. Numbers ending in 5–9, 0, or 11–14 are followed by genitive plural рублей rubley, копеек kopeyek.

Other languages

In several languages spoken in Russia and the former Soviet Union, the currency name has no etymological relation with ruble. Especially in Turkic languages or languages influenced by them, the ruble is often known (also officially) as som or sum (meaning pure), or manat (from Russian moneta, meaning coin). Soviet banknotes had their value printed in the languages of all 15 republics of the Soviet Union.

History

Imperial ruble

From the 14th to the 17th centuries the ruble was neither a coin nor a currency but rather a unit of weight. The most used currency was a small silver coin called denga (pl. dengi). There were two variants of the denga, minted in Novgorod and Moscow. Thus one account ruble consisted of 100 Novgorod or 200 Moscow dengi ( of silver). As the Novgorod denga bore the image of a rider with a spear, it later has become known as kopek.

In 1654–1655 tsar Alexis I tried to carry out a monetary reform and ordered the mintage of silver one ruble coins from imported joachimsthalers and new kopek coins from copper (old silver kopeks were left in circulation). Although around 1 million of such rubles was made, its lower weight (28–32 grams) against the nominal ruble (48 g) led to counterfeiting, speculation and inflation, and after the Copper Riot of 1662 the new monetary system was abandoned in favour of the old one.

Russian Empire
In 1704 Peter the Great finally reformed the old Russian monetary system, minting a silver ruble coin of weight  and 72% fineness; hence 20.22 g fine silver. The decision to subdivide it primarily into 100 copper kopeks, rather than 200 Muscovite denga, made the Russian ruble the world's first decimal currency.

The amount of silver in a ruble varied in the 18th century. Additionally, coins worth over a ruble were minted in gold and platinum. By the end of the 18th century, the ruble was set to 4 zolotnik 21 dolya (or 4 zolotnik, almost exactly equal to 18 grams) of pure silver or 27 dolya (almost exactly equal to ) of pure gold, with a ratio of 15:1 for the values of the two metals. In 1828, platinum coins were introduced with 1 ruble equal to 77 dolya (3.451 grams).

On 17 December 1885, a new standard was adopted which did not change the silver ruble but reduced the gold content to 1.161 grams, pegging the gold ruble to the French franc at a rate of 1 ruble = 4 francs. This rate was revised in 1897 to 1 ruble = 2 francs (17.424 dolya or 0.77424 g fine gold). This ruble was worth about US$0.5145 in 1914.

With the outbreak of World War I, the gold standard peg was dropped and the ruble fell in value, suffering from hyperinflation in the early 1920s. With the founding of the Soviet Union in 1922, the Russian ruble was replaced by the Soviet ruble. The pre-revolutionary Chervonetz was temporarily brought back into circulation from 1922 to 1925.

Russia's coins

Silver 20 kopeks were introduced in 1820, followed by copper 10 kopeks minted between 1830 and 1839, and copper 3 kopeks introduced in 1840. Between 1828 and 1845, platinum 3, 6 and 12 rubles were issued. In 1860, silver 15 kopeks were introduced, due to the use of this denomination (equal to 1 złoty) in Poland, whilst, in 1869, gold 3 rubles were introduced. In 1886, a new gold coinage was introduced consisting of 5 and 10 ruble coins. This was followed by another in 1897. In addition to smaller 5 and 10 ruble coins,  and 15 ruble coins were issued for a single year, as these were equal in size to the previous 5 and 10 ruble coins. The gold coinage was suspended in 1911, with the other denominations produced until the First World War.

Constantine ruble
The Constantine ruble (Russian:) is a rare silver coin of the Russian Empire bearing the profile of Constantine, the brother of emperors Alexander I and Nicholas I. Its manufacture was being prepared at the Saint Petersburg Mint during the brief Interregnum of 1825, but it was never minted in numbers, and never circulated in public. Its existence became known in 1857 in foreign publications.

Banknotes

Imperial issues

In 1768, during the reign of Catherine the Great, the Assignation Bank was instituted to issue the government paper money. It opened in Saint Petersburg and in Moscow in 1769.

In 1769, Assignation rubles were introduced for 25, 50, 75 and 100 rubles, with 5 and 10 rubles added in 1787 and 200 rubles in 1819. The value of the Assignation rubles fell relative to the coins until, in 1839, the relationship was fixed at 1 silver ruble =  assignat rubles. In 1840, the State Commercial Bank issued 3, 5, 10, 25, 50 and 100 ruble notes, followed by 50 ruble credit notes of the Custody Treasury and State Loan Bank.

In 1843, the Assignation Bank ceased operations, and state credit notes (Russian:) were introduced in denominations of 1, 3, 5, 10, 25, 50 and 100 rubles. In 1859 a paper credit ruble was worth about nine-tenths of a silver ruble These circulated, in various types, until the revolution, with 500 ruble notes added in 1898 and 250 and 1000 ruble notes added in 1917. In 1915, two kinds of small change notes were issued. One, issued by the Treasury, consisted of regular style (if small) notes for 1, 2, 3, 5 and 50 kopeks. The other consisted of the designs of stamps printed onto card with text and the imperial eagle printed on the reverse. These were in denominations of 1, 2, 3, 10, 15 and 20 kopeks.

Provisional Government issues
In 1917, the Provisional Government issued treasury notes for 20 and 40 rubles. These notes are known as "Kerenki" or "Kerensky rubles". The provisional government also had 25 and 1,000 ruble state credit notes printed in the United States but most were not issued.

Soviet ruble

The Soviet ruble replaced the ruble of the Russian Empire. The Soviet ruble (code: SUR) was the currency of the Soviet Union between 1917 and the breakup of the Soviet Union in 1991. The Soviet ruble was issued by the State Bank of the USSR. The Soviet ruble continued to be used in the 15 Post-Soviet states.

The Soviet ruble was used until 1992 in Russia (replaced by Russian ruble), Ukraine (replaced by Ukrainian karbovanets), Estonia (replaced by Estonian kroon), Latvia (replaced by Latvian ruble), Lithuania (replaced by Lithuanian talonas), and until 1993 in Belarus (replaced by Belarusian ruble), Georgia (replaced by Georgian lari), Armenia (replaced by Armenian dram), Kazakhstan (replaced by Kazakhstani tenge), Kyrgyzstan (replaced by Kyrgyzstani som), Moldova (replaced by Moldovan cupon), Turkmenistan (replaced by Turkmenistani manat), Uzbekistan (replaced by Uzbekistani sum), and until 1994 in Azerbaijan (replaced by Azerbaijani manat) and until 1995 in Tajikistan (replaced by Tajikistani ruble).

Symbol 

The ruble sign “₽” is a currency sign used to represent the monetary unit of account in Russia. It features a Cyrillic letter Р (transliterated as "Er" in the Latin alphabet) with an additional horizontal stroke.

See also
 
 
 Ruble (disambiguation) for a more comprehensive directory of past and present currencies called ruble or rouble.

Explanatory notes

References

External links

  

Currencies of Russia
Denominations (currency)
Modern obsolete currencies
Numismatics